The 1983–84 OHL season was the fourth season of the Ontario Hockey League. The Leo Lalonde Memorial Trophy is inaugurated for the overage player of the year. Fifteen teams each played 70 games. The Ottawa 67's won the J. Ross Robertson Cup, defeating the Kitchener Rangers.

Regular season

Final standings
Note: GP = Games played; W = Wins; L = Losses; T = Ties; GF = Goals for; GA = Goals against; PTS = Points; x = clinched playoff berth; y = clinched first round bye; z = clinched division title & first round bye

Leyden Division

Emms Division

Scoring leaders

Playoffs

Division quarter-finals

Leyden Division

(3) Peterborough Petes vs. (6) Cornwall Royals

(4) Oshawa Generals vs. (5) Belleville Bulls

Emms Division

(3) Sault Ste. Marie Greyhounds vs. (6) Windsor Spitfires

(4) London Knights vs. (5) North Bay Centennials

Division semi-finals

Leyden Division

(1) Ottawa 67's vs. (4) Oshawa Generals

(2) Toronto Marlboros vs. (3) Peterborough Petes

Emms Division

(1) Kitchener Rangers vs. (4) London Knights

(2) Brantford Alexanders vs. (3) Sault Ste. Marie Greyhounds

Division finals

Leyden Division

(1) Ottawa 67's vs. (2) Toronto Marlboros

Emms Division

(1) Kitchener Rangers vs. (3) Sault Ste. Marie Greyhounds

J. Ross Robertson Cup

(L1) Ottawa 67's vs. (E1) Kitchener Rangers

Awards

1984 OHL Priority Selection
The Sudbury Wolves held the first overall pick in the 1984 Ontario Priority Selection and selected Dave Moylan from the St. Mary's Lincolns. Moylan was awarded the Jack Ferguson Award, awarded to the top pick in the draft.

Below are the players who were selected in the first round of the 1984 Ontario Hockey League Priority Selection.

See also
List of OHA Junior A standings
List of OHL seasons
1984 Memorial Cup
1984 NHL Entry Draft
1983 in sports
1984 in sports

References

HockeyDB

Ontario Hockey League seasons
OHL